Messier 23, also known as NGC 6494, is an open cluster of stars in the northwest of the southern constellation of Sagittarius. It was discovered by Charles Messier in 1764. It can be found in good conditions with binoculars or a modestly sized telescope. It is in front of "an extensive gas and dust network", which there may be no inter-association. It is within 5° the sun's position (namely in mid-December) so can be occulted by the moon.

The cluster is centered about 2,050 light years away. The cluster is around 330 million years old with a near-solar metallicity of [Fe/H] = −0.04. The brightest component (lucida) is of magnitude 9.3. Five of the cluster members are candidate red giants, while orange variable VV Sgr in the far south, is a candidate asymptotic giant branch star.

A 6th-magnitude star, shown in the top-right corner, figures in the far north-west as a foreground star – HD 163245 (HR 6679).

Gallery

See also
 List of Messier objects

Footnotes and References

Footnotes

References

External links

 Messier 23, SEDS Messier pages
 

Messier 023
Orion–Cygnus Arm
Messier 023
023
Messier 023
17640620